was a private junior college at Katsushika Ward, Tokyoin Japan. It was succeeded by the newly established Tokyo Seiei College.

History 
 Olympia Gakuen was established in 1947.
 The Seitoku Advanced School of Nutrition (高等栄養学校) is founded in 1954. It was named after the 7th-century regent Shōtoku. Shō (Go'on reading) can also be read sei (Kan’on reading), the latter was chosen for this school.
 It was reorganized into the Seitoku Vocational School of Nutrition (栄養専門学校 Eiyō  Senmon-gakkō) in 1957.
 Seitoku Junior College of Nutrition (栄養短期大学) was established 1963. The first year included 50 students, including 5 males.
 The evening school was set up in 1964.
 The Department of Food and Nutrition was renamed Department of Food and Nutritional Studies in 1969.
 The special training program on food studies was set up in 1972, but was abolished in 1983.
 In 1986, the Department of Food and Nutritional Studies was separated into:
 major in Nutritional Studies
 major in Food Science 
 It became officially co-educational in 1987; however, in practice, it remained effectively a women's university.
 The advanced course food nourishment major in 1996 is set up.
 Endeavours were undertaken to make it more co-ed again in 2001.
 Professional confectionery, baking, and cooking classes were offered as part of the food science major in 2003.
 It stopped recruiting new students in the fiscal year 2004 and would be eventually replaced by Tokyo Seiei College.

Subjects 
 Food nourishment
 Day school
 Food nourishment major
 Food science major
 Nighttime: started in 1985, with 20 students, of whom 4 were males.

Advanced course 
 Food nourishment major

Special course 
 The food major: with cook training facilities.

Universities and colleges in Tokyo
Educational institutions established in 1963
Japanese junior colleges
Private universities and colleges in Japan
1963 establishments in Japan